The Tobin Range is a mountain range in eastern Pershing County, Nevada. The Tobin Range includes Mount Tobin, a  summit that dominates the surrounding area. Mount Tobin has a latitude of 40°22′37″N and a longitude of 117°31′33″W.

To the north the Tobins are separated from Buffalo Mountain in Humboldt County by Smelser Pass and to the northeast from the Battle Mountains in Lander County by the broad Buffalo Valley. To the east and southeast lie the Fish Creek Mountains and the small Augusta Mountains. To the west and southwest lie the East Range and the Stillwater Range across Pleasant Valley. To the northwest is the Sonoma Range in Humboldt County.

Tobin Range was named after Clement L. Tobin.

References 

Mountain ranges of Nevada
Mountain ranges of Pershing County, Nevada